Mareșal (Marshal) is the highest rank in the Army of Romania, the Romanian Armed Forces.  It is the equivalent of a field marshal in other countries.

The rank of mareșal can only be bestowed to a General or Admiral, in time of war for exceptional military merits, by the President of Romania and confirmed by the Supreme Council of National Defense.

Only three non-royal persons were bestowed the rank mareșal to date: Alexandru Averescu, Constantin Prezan, and Ion Antonescu. The first two were Generals during World War I, and the last was General during World War II, and Ruler of Romania between the abdication of King Carol II (6 September 1940) and his arrest by King Michael I (23 August 1944). Of the Romanian kings, Ferdinand I, Carol II and Michael I were Marshals of Romania. King Carol I was simultaneously Russian and German field marshal.

See also
Mareșal tank destroyer

References

Military of Romania
Romanian Land Forces
Romanian Naval Forces
Romanian Air Force
Gendarmerie (Romania)
Military ranks of Romania
Marshals